John Gary Lane  , (born May 2, 1942), commonly known as Gary Lane, is a judge and former political figure in the Canadian province of Saskatchewan. He represented Lumsden from 1971 to 1975 and Qu'Appelle from 1975 to 1976 as a Liberal and then Qu'Appelle from 1976 to 1982 and Qu'Appelle-Lumsden from 1982 to 1991 as a Progressive Conservative in the Legislative Assembly of Saskatchewan.

He was born in Saskatoon, Saskatchewan, the son of Richard Louis Lane and Kathleen May Flanagan, and was educated in Saskatoon and at the University of Saskatchewan, where he received a Bachelor of Law degree. Lane articled in Saskatoon and was called to the Saskatchewan bar in 1966. He worked as a Crown solicitor in the Saskatchewan Department of the Attorney General and executive assistant to the Attorney General from 1969 to 1971. Lane then practised law in Regina. He married Elizabeth Mary McLaughlin in 1979. In 1982, he was named Queen's Counsel (now King's Counsel, on the accession of Charles III).

In October 1976, Lane left the Liberal party. He served as president of the Progressive Conservative Party of Saskatchewan. Lane served in the provincial cabinet as Attorney General, as Provincial Secretary, as Minister of Telephones, as Minister of Intergovernmental Affairs, as Minister of Justice and Attorney General, as Minister of Finance and as Minister of Revenue and Financial Services. He resigned from cabinet and vacated his seat in September 1991.

Later that same month, he was named to the Saskatchewan Court of Appeal.

Electoral history

|-

|NDP
|Cliff Thurston
|align="right"|2,743
|align="right"|44.34%
|align="right"|+8.16

|Prog. Conservative
|C. Robin Hahn
|align="right"|568
|align="right"|9.18%
|align="right"|-6.51
|- bgcolor="white"
!align="left" colspan=3|Total
!align="right"|6,186
!align="right"|100.00%
!align="right"|

|-

|NDP
|Donald W. Cody
|align="right"|3,430
|align="right"|37.97%
|align="right"|-6.37

|Prog. Conservative
|F. Warren Denzin
|align="right"|1,806
|align="right"|20.00%
|align="right"|+10.82
|- bgcolor="white"
!align="left" colspan=3|Total
!align="right"|9,032
!align="right"|100.00%
!align="right"|

|-

|style="width: 130px"|Progressive Conservative
|Gary Lane
|align="right"|7,231
|align="right"|46.30%
|align="right"|+26.30

|NDP
|Greg Willows
|align="right"|6,844
|align="right"|43.83%
|align="right"|+5.86

|- bgcolor="white"
!align="left" colspan=3|Total
!align="right"|15,616
!align="right"|100.00%
!align="right"|

|-

|style="width: 130px"|Progressive Conservative
|Gary Lane
|align="right"|5,643
|align="right"|65.77%
|align="right"|+19.47

|NDP
|Tom Usherwood
|align="right"|2,372
|align="right"|27.65%
|align="right"|-16.18

|- bgcolor="white"
!align="left" colspan=3|Total
!align="right"|8,580
!align="right"|100.00%
!align="right"|

|-

|style="width: 130px"|Progressive Conservative
|Gary Lane
|align="right"|4,490
|align="right"|47.55%
|align="right"|-18.22

|NDP
|Suzanne Murray
|align="right"|3,763
|align="right"|39.86%
|align="right"|+12.21

|- bgcolor="white"
!align="left" colspan=3|Total
!align="right"|9,442
!align="right"|100.00%
!align="right"|

References

External links 
 

1942 births
Attorneys-General of Saskatchewan
Judges in Saskatchewan
Living people
Members of the Executive Council of Saskatchewan
Politicians from Saskatoon
Progressive Conservative Party of Saskatchewan MLAs
Saskatchewan Liberal Party MLAs
Canadian King's Counsel
Finance ministers of Saskatchewan